The Methow are a Native American tribe that lived along the Methow River, a tributary of the Columbia River in northern Washington. The river's English name is taken from that of the tribe. The name "Methow" comes from the Okanagan placename /mətxʷú/, meaning "sunflower (seeds)". The tribe's name for the river was Buttlemuleemauch, meaning "salmon falls river".

The Methow were a relatively small tribe, with an estimated population of 800 in 1780 and 300 in 1870. Today, the Methow live primarily on the Colville Indian Reservation in Washington, where they form part of the Confederated Tribes of the Colville Reservation, which is recognized by the United States government as an American Indian Tribe.

The Methow now speak English. Their endangered language, known as Colville-Okanagan, spoken only by older adults, is a part of the Southern Interior Salish linguistic branch.

Notes

Native American tribes in Washington (state)
Interior Salish
People from Okanogan County, Washington